David Wayne (born Wayne James McMeekan, January 30, 1914 – February 9, 1995) was an American stage and screen actor with a career spanning over 50 years.

Early life and career
Wayne was born in Traverse City, Michigan, the son of Helen Matilda (née Mason) and John David McMeekan. His mother died when he was four. He grew up in Bloomingdale, Michigan.

Wayne attended Western Michigan University for two years and then went to work as a statistician in Cleveland. He began acting with Cleveland's Shakesperean repertory theatre in 1936.

When World War II began, Wayne volunteered as an ambulance driver with the British Army in North Africa. When the United States entered the war he joined the United States Army.

Wayne's first major Broadway role was Og the leprechaun in Finian's Rainbow, for which he won the Theatre World Award and the first ever Tony for Actor, Supporting or Featured (Musical). While appearing in the play, he and co-star Albert Sharpe were recruited by producer David O. Selznick to play Irish characters in the film Portrait of Jennie (1948).

In 1948, Wayne was one of 50 applicants (out of approximately 700) granted membership in New York's newly formed Actors Studio.
He was awarded a second Tony for Best Actor (Dramatic) for The Teahouse of the August Moon and was nominated as Best Actor (Musical) for The Happy Time. He originated the role of Ensign Pulver in the classic stage comedy Mister Roberts and also appeared in Say, Darling; After the Fall; and Incident at Vichy.

Film and television career
In films, Wayne most often was cast as a supporting player, such as the charming cad and singer/songwriter/neighbor opposite Spencer Tracy and Katharine Hepburn in Adam's Rib (1949). He portrayed the child killer, originally played by Peter Lorre, in the remake of M (1951), a chance to see him in a rare leading role, even rarer as a villain. Wayne also appeared in four films with Marilyn Monroe (more than any other actor): As Young as You Feel (1951), We're Not Married (1952), O. Henry's Full House (1952) (although he shared no scenes with Monroe), and How to Marry a Millionaire (1953) where he did have scenes with Monroe. He costarred in The Tender Trap (1955) with Frank Sinatra, Debbie Reynolds, and Celeste Holm.

In 1955, Wayne starred in the NBC comedy Norby. Wayne appeared in the late 1950s on ABC's The Pat Boone Chevy Showroom and the Twilight Zone episode "Escape Clause". He starred as Darius Woodley in two 1961 episodes of NBC's The Outlaws starring Barton MacLane. Also in 1961, Wayne appeared in the Bell Telephone Company-produced driver safety film Anatomy of an Accident, about a family outing tragically cut short by a car accident.

He played the Mad Hatter, one of the recurring villains in the 1960s television series Batman. In 1964, he guest-starred in the series finale, "Pay Now, Die Later", of CBS's drama Mr. Broadway, starring Craig Stevens as public relations specialist Mike Bell. In the storyline, Wayne's character, the wealthy John Zeck, hires Bell to prepare Zeck's obituary before his death. Also in the 1960s, Wayne was a radio host on NBC's magazine program Monitor.

Wayne was known for his role as Dr. Charles Dutton in Michael Crichton's The Andromeda Strain (1971). He also appeared as Uncle Timothy Jamison in the NBC sitcom The Brian Keith Show and played Charles Dutton in The Good Life, also on NBC. Wayne made a guest appearance in a leading role for a 1975 episode of Gunsmoke titled "I Have Promises to Keep". He co-starred with Jim Hutton in the 1976 television series Ellery Queen (as Inspector Richard Queen).

In 1973 on Mannix season 6 episode 22  Wayne played a hobo being hunted by the men mistaking him for a different hobo who witnesses a criminal still alive after staging his own death.

In 1978, Wayne played James Lawrence in the ABC drama Family, and he played Digger Barnes in four episodes of the CBS soap opera Dallas. (Wayne's friend Keenan Wynn replaced Wayne in the role of Digger Barnes.) Wayne co-starred in the role of Dr. Amos Weatherby in the 1979–82 television series House Calls with Lynn Redgrave and later Sharon Gless.

Personal life
Wayne was married to Jane Gordon in 1941 and had two daughters, Susan Wayne Kearney and Melinda Wayne, and a son, Timothy. Timothy disappeared and was presumed drowned during a rafting trip in August 1970. Wayne's wife, daughter of opera vocalist Jeanne Gordon, died in 1993. Susan died in 2019; her remains were cremated and given to her family.

Wayne was a lifelong Democrat who supported Adlai Stevenson's campaign during the 1952 presidential election.

Death
On February 9, 1995, Wayne died in his Santa Monica, California, home from complications of lung cancer at the age of 81. His remains were cremated and distributed to his family.

Awards
Wayne won two Tony Awards, one in 1947 for Finian's Rainbow and one in 1954 for The Teahouse of the August Moon.

Filmography
Features:

Stranger on the Third Floor (1940) as Cab Driver (uncredited)
Portrait of Jennie (1948) as Gus O'Toole
Adam's Rib (1949) as Kip Lurie
The Reformer and the Redhead (1950) as Arthur Colner Maxwell
Stella (1950) as Carl Granger
My Blue Heaven (1950) as Walter Pringle
Up Front (1951) as Joe
M (1951) as Martin W. Harrow
As Young as You Feel (1951) as Joe Elliott
With a Song in My Heart (1952) as Don Ross
Wait Till the Sun Shines, Nellie (1952) as Ben Halper
We're Not Married! (1952) as Jeff Norris
O. Henry's Full House (1952) as Horace (segment "The Cop and the Anthem")
The I Don't Care Girl (1953) as Ed McCoy
Tonight We Sing (1953) as Sol Hurok
Down Among the Sheltering Palms (1953) as Lt. Carl G. Schmidt
How to Marry a Millionaire (1953) as Freddie Denmark
Hell and High Water (1954) as Tugboat Walker
The Tender Trap (1955) as Joe McCall
The Naked Hills (1956) as Tracy Powell
The Three Faces of Eve (1957) as Ralph White
The Sad Sack (1957) as Corporal Larry Dolan
The Last Angry Man (1959) as Woodrow 'Woody' Thrasher
The Big Gamble (1961) as Samuel Brennan
The Andromeda Strain (1971) as Dr. Charles Dutton
The African Elephant (1971, Documentary) as Narrator
Huckleberry Finn (1974) as The Duke
The Front Page (1974) as Bensinger
Tubby the Tuba (1975) as Pee-Wee the Piccolo (voice)
The Apple Dumpling Gang (1975) as Col. T.R. Clydesdale
A Place to Be (1979, Documentary) as Narrator
The Prize Fighter (1979) as Pop Morgan
Finders Keepers (1984) as Stapleton
The Survivalist (1987) as Dub Daniels

Short Subjects:
Screen Snapshots: Hollywood Awards (1951) as Himself
Screen Snapshots: Hollywood Night Life (1952) as Himself
Anatomy of an Accident (1961) as John Avery
John F. Kennedy: 1917-1963 (1979) as Narrator

Television work

Great Catherine (1948, TV Movie)
Norby (1955) as Preston Norby / Pearson Norby (canceled after 13 episodes)
Alfred Hitchcock Presents, "One More Mile to Go" (1957) as Sam Jacoby
The Strawberry Blonde (1959, TV Movie) as Biff Grimes
The Twilight Zone, "Escape Clause" (1959) as Walter Bedeker
Wagon Train (1960) ('The Shad Bennington Story') as Shadrack Bennington
Naked City, "The Multiplicity of Herbert Konish" (1962) as Herbert Konish
Teahouse of the August Moon (1962 TV movie) as Sakini
Kings of Broadway (1962, TV Movie) (unsold pilot)
The Alfred Hitchcock Hour, "The 31st of February" (1963) as Andrew Anderson
Cowboy and the Tiger (1963, TV Movie) as Narrator (unsold pilot)
Lamp At Midnight (1966, TV Movie) as Father Firenzuola
Batman (1966, guest villain, episodes 13, 14, 69, 70) as The Mad Hatter
Arsenic and Old Lace (1969, TV Movie) as Teddy Brewster
The Boy Who Stole the Elephant (1970, TV Movie) as Colonel Rufus Ryder
Night Gallery, "The Diary" (1971) as Dr. Mill (segment "The Diary")
Mooch Goes to Hollywood (1971, TV Movie) as Himself (uncredited)
The Good Life (1971–1972) as Charles Dutton
The Catcher (1972, TV Movie) as Armand Faber
The Dark Side (1972) (unsold pilot)
The Streets of San Francisco (1972, TV Series) as Wally Sensibaugh
Banacek ("Ten Thousand Dollars a Page") (1973) as Walter Tyson
Hawaii Five-O ("30,000 Rooms and I Have the Key") (1974) as Horus
Return of the Big Cat (1974, TV Movie) as Grandpa Jubal
Barney Miller ("Bureaucrat") (1975) as E. J. Heiss
Gunsmoke ("I Have Promises to Keep") (1973-1975) as Reverend Byrne / Judge Warfield
It's a Bird...It's a Plane...It's Superman (1975, TV Movie) as Dr. Abner Sedgwick
Ellery Queen (1975–1976) as Inspector Richard Queen
Once an Eagle (1976, TV Mini-Series) as Col. Terwilliger
In the Glitter Palace (1977, TV Movie) as Nate Redstone
Hunter ("Yesterday Upon the Stair") (1977)
Black Beauty (1978, TV Mini-Series) as Mr. Dowling / Narrator
Loose Change (1978, TV Mini-Series) as Dr. Moe Sinden
Murder at the Mardi Gras (1978, TV Movie) as Mickey Mills
Dallas (1978) as Digger Barnes
The Gift of Love (1978, TV Movie) as O'Henry / Narrator
The Girls in the Office (1979, TV Movie) as Ben Nayfack
An American Christmas Carol (1979, TV Movie) as Merrivale
Eight is Enough (1980) as Matt
House Calls (1979–1982) as Dr. Amos Weatherby
Matt Houston (1984) S2/Ep20, “Blood Ties” as Bill Houston 
Murder, She Wrote (1985, TV Series) as Cyrus Leffingwell
Newhart (1985, TV Series) as Mr. Pittman (episode "Pirate Pete")
The Golden Girls (1986) as Big Daddy
Poker Alice (1987, TV Movie, based on the frontier gambler Poker Alice, with Elizabeth Taylor in the starring role) as Amos (final film role)

Stage appearances

As You Like It (1935) (Cleveland)
Escape This Night (April 22 – May 1938) (Broadway)
Dance Night (October 14–16, 1938) (Broadway)
The American Way (January 21 – September 23, 1939) (Broadway)
The Scene of the Crime (March 28 – April 4, 1940) (Broadway)The Merry Widow (Revival) (August 4, 1943 – May 6, 1944) (Broadway)Peepshow (February 3–26, 1944) (Broadway)Park Avenue (November 4, 1946 – January 4, 1947) (Broadway)Finian's Rainbow (January 10, 1947 – October 2, 1948) (Broadway) (replaced by Philip Truex in February 1948)Mister Roberts (February 18, 1948 – January 6, 1951) (Broadway) (replaced by Larry Blyden in 1950)The Teahouse of the August Moon (October 15, 1953 – March 24, 1956) (Broadway) (replaced by Burgess Meredith in 1954)The Ponder Heart (February 16 – June 23, 1956) (Broadway)The Loud Red Patrick (October 3 – December 22, 1956) (Broadway)Say, Darling (April 3, 1958 – January 17, 1959) (Broadway) (replaced by Eddie Albert in 1959)Send Me No Flowers (December 5, 1960 – January 7, 1961) (Broadway)Venus at Large (April 12–14, 1962) (Broadway)Too True to Be Good (Revival) (March 12 – June 1, 1963) (Broadway)After the Fall (January 23, 1964 – May 29, 1965) (ANTA Washington Square Theatre)Marco Millions (February 20 – June 18, 1964) (ANTA Washington Square Theatre)But For Whom Charlie (March 12 – July 2, 1964) (ANTA Washington Square Theatre)Incident At Vichy (December 3, 1964 – May 7, 1965) (ANTA Washington Square Theatre)The Yearling (December 10–11, 1965) (Broadway)Show Boat  (July 1966)   Lincoln Center  (Role; Capt. Andy)The Happy Time'' (January 18 – September 28, 1968) (Broadway)

Radio appearances

Notes

References

External links

David Wayne as The Mad Hatter

1914 births
1995 deaths
Male actors from Michigan
American male film actors
American male musical theatre actors
American male stage actors
American male television actors
Deaths from lung cancer in California
Donaldson Award winners
People from Traverse City, Michigan
Theatre World Award winners
Tony Award winners
20th-century American male actors
Western Michigan University alumni
California Democrats
Michigan Democrats
20th-century American male singers
20th-century American singers
United States Army personnel of World War I